The Roman Catholic Diocese of Barahona (erected 24 April 1976) is a suffragan diocese of the Archdiocese of Santo Domingo.

Ordinaries
Fabio Mamerto Rivas Santos, S.D.B. (1976 - 1999) - Bishop Emeritus
Rafael Leónidas Felipe y Núñez (1999 - 2015) - resigned, Bishop Emeritus
Bishop-elect Rev. Andrés Napoleón Romero Cárdenas (2015–present)

References

External links

Barahona
Barahona
Barahona
Barahona, Roman Catholic Diocese of
1976 establishments in the Dominican Republic